The South African National Defence Force, like most around the world, has various insignia. The army badges authorised for wear are listed here. If members from other arms of service qualify for these badges, they are also permitted to wear them, The criteria are, in most cases, current but there is some historical information included.

This page provides an extensive list of various badges used by the South African Army to distinguish and identify different military units, branches, and ranks. It includes descriptions and images of badges such as shoulder titles, formation patches, trade badges, qualification badges, and others. Some of the badges listed have historical significance, such as those used during the apartheid era, while others are currently in use. It also includes information on the history and evolution of badges in the South African Army.

Background 
New badges have been created to be worn on the camouflage combat dress. These badges are made of black, embossed plastic and are set against a thatch green background. According to dress regulations, only Parachute Qualification Badges may be worn on the left breast, above the pocket. On the right breast, members are expected to wear their name tag, followed by a maximum of two other badges.

Insignia

Good Conduct Stripes 
These are worn on the right (pocket), below the name badge on Dress No 1 – 4. There are three Levels - Awarded for good conduct. The criteria for the awarding of this badge are unknown at this stage. 
{| class=wikitable style="text-align: left;"
|+ Good Conduct
|-
|colspan="5"|Garment with Pocket: Centred on the right pocket
|-
|-
!colspan="5"| Insignia|-
! Level !! Embossed !! Service Dress !! NCG !! Army Band
|-
| I
| 
| 
| 
| 
|-
| II
| 
|
| No Image
| 
|-
| III
| 
| 
| 
| 
|}

 Badge for Reserve Voluntary Service (BRVS)

 61 Mechanised Battalion Operational Service Badge 

The unit awarded a small badge called the Operational Badge for those in or attached to the unit who deployed with the unit on operational duties. The initial version of this had a yellow backing and was awarded only for cross border operations into Angola. A subsequent version with a green backing was mooted, which was intended to be for internal duties. This green backed badge was never approved and the Yellow backed badge continued to be awarded for all operations in which 61 Mech was involved, including internal ones. The badge consists of a dagger with three diagonal lightning bolts in red across it. A subdued version was produced for wear on nutria (brown's) uniforms. With the introduction of camouflage, a new version was produced on green thatching.

 Air Supply 

 Qualification: Air Supply 

 Qualification: Air Supply Instructor 

 Gunner 

Identification: General of the Gunners

Proficiency: Master Gunner

 Qualification: Artillery No 1

 Dog Handler's Qualification 
 Qualification: Dog Handler 

 Qualification: Dog Instructor 

 Equestrian Qualification 
 Qualification: Basic Equestrian 

 Qualification: Equestrian Instructor 

 Qualification: Equestrian Advanced 

 Parachute Qualification Badges 

Awarding Authority
The Awarding Authority is the GOC SA Army Infantry Formation, delegated to the Officer Commanding 44 Parachute Regiment. The qualification badge will be issued on completion of the course and will be controlled by means of a register kept at US 3

Qualification: Paratrooper Basic 

 Qualification: Paratrooper Dispatcher 

 Qualification: Paratrooper Instructor 

Qualification: Free Fall Paratrooper

 Qualification: Paratrooper Free Fall Instructor 

 Pathfinder 
 Qualification: Pathfinder 

 Air Assault 

 Qualification: Air Assault 

 Musketry Proficiency
 Proficiency: 2nd Class Shot – Rifle 

 Proficiency: 1st Class Shot – Rifle 

 Qualification: Sniper 

 Physical Training Instructor's Qualification Badges Awarding Authority: In all cases Director Physical Training Sport and Recreation, SAMHS

 Qualification: Advanced PT Instructor 

 Qualification: Assistant PT Instructor 

 Attack Diver 
 Qualification: Attack Diver Badge 

 Qualification: Attack Diver Instructor Badge 

 Demolitions Qualifications 
 Qualification: Explosive Ordnance Disposal (EOD) 

 Qualification: Demolitions Phase 1 Qualification Badge. (Dems 1) 

 Qualification: Demolitions Phase 2 Qualification Badge. (Tactical Demolitions) 

 Qualification: Improvised Explosive Device Disposal Qualification Badge (IEDD) 

 Fireman’s Qualification Badges 
 Awarding Authority: SSO Fire & Rescue Services (Log Div) as the functional competency authority for Fire and Rescue Services in the DOD after completion of training at DOD Fire Training School and recommendation by the OC
 Limitations on Wearing by Officers: Only officers in posts directly connected with fire fighting may wear the identifications.

 Qualification: Fire Fighter 

 Qualification: Senior Fire Fighter 

 Motorcyclist Qualification 

 Qualification: Motor Cyclist 

 Qualification: Motor Cycle Instructor 

 Pilots 
 Insignia: 
 Insignia: 
 Insignia''':

Special Forces

Qualification: Special Forces Operator Badge

Qualification: Special Forces Operator Identification (Gold, 10 Years)

Tracking Qualifications

Qualification: Tracker

Qualification: Tracker Instructor

Internal Auditor & Investigator

Military Law

SA Corps of Bandsmen

Insignia: Chaplains

Chaplain Accouterments

Chaplain, Christian

Chaplain, Hindu

Chaplain, Jewish

Chaplain, Muslim

Branch of Service

Rank Insignia

Rank Insignia: Officers 
Officer's rank is made up of a few components, including the "Star" and the "Crest" (A part of the National Coat of Arms)

General

Lt General

Major General

Brigadier General

Colonel

Lieutenant Colonel

Major

Captain

Lieutenant

Second Lieutenant

Candidate Officer

Rank Insignia: Warrant Officers

SANDF Rank Insignia WO1 Level 1 (Master Chief Warrant Officer)

SANDF Rank Insignia WO1 Level 2  (Senior Chief Warrant Officer)

SANDF Rank Insignia WO1 Level 3 (Chief Warrant Officer)

SANDF Rank Insignia WO1 Level 4a (Master Warrant Officer)

SANDF Rank Insignia WO1 Level 4b (Senior Warrant Officer)

SANDF Rank Insignia WO1 (Warrant Officer 1st Class)

SANDF Rank Insignia WO2 (Warrant Officer 2nd Class)

Rank Insignia: NCOs

Staff Sergeant

Sergeant

Corporal

Lance Corporal

See also 
 List of Helmet and Shoulder Flashes and Hackles of South African Military Units
 South African Army corps and branches

References

Notes 

Military ranks of South Africa
South African Army
Military specialty insignia